Sophie van Gestel (born 29 June 1991, in Oostelbeers) is a Dutch beach volleyball player. As of 2012, she plays with Madelein Meppelink. The pair participated in the 2012 Summer Olympics tournament and lost in the round of 16 to Brazilians Juliana Felisberta and Larissa França who eventually won the bronze medal.

As of 2015, she plays with Jantine van der Vlist. They qualified for 2016 Summer Olympics in Rio de Janeiro. The pair played in Pool-E and were eliminated with a set win/loss of 1W/6L.

References

External links
 
 
 

1991 births
Living people
Dutch women's beach volleyball players
Beach volleyball players at the 2012 Summer Olympics
Beach volleyball players at the 2016 Summer Olympics
Olympic beach volleyball players of the Netherlands
People from Oirschot
Beach volleyball players at the 2015 European Games
European Games competitors for the Netherlands
Sportspeople from North Brabant
21st-century Dutch women